Mećava may refer to:

 Mećava (surname)
 Mećava (film) ("Snowstorm"), a 1977 Croatian film